Peter Fraenkel may refer to:

 Peter Fraenkel (journalist) (born 1926), journalist and author, controller of European services for the British Broadcasting Corporation
 Peter Fraenkel (marine engineer), British marine engineer 
 Peter Fraenkel (civil engineer) (1915–2009), British civil engineer